The Ministry of Agriculture of the Russian Federation is a ministry of the Government of Russia responsible for agricultural production, soil conservation, rural development, agricultural market regulation, and financial stabilization of the farm sector.

The Ministry of Agriculture is subdivided into functional departments including the Federal Agency for Fishery and the Federal Service for Veterinary and Phytosanitary Supervision. It was formed from the Russian SFSR branch of the Ministry of Agriculture and Food in 1990 and is headquartered in the Narkomzem Building in Krasnoselsky District, Moscow.

Dmitry Patrushev has been Minister of Agriculture since 18 May 2018.

History
The first Imperial Russian ministry to deal with agricultural and rural issues was the Ministry of State Assets of the Russian Empire, formed in 1837.  Successor ministries were:

See also

 People's Commissariat for Agriculture
 Agriculture in Russia
 Agriculture in the Soviet Union
 Agriculture in the Russian Empire

References

Bibliography
 Volin, Lazar, Century of Russian Agriculture, From Alexander II to Khrushchev.
 Шилов, Д. Н. Государственные деятели Российской империи 1802—1917. С.-Петербург, 2002.
 Государственная власть СССР. Высшие органы власти и управления и их руководители. 1923—1991 гг. Москва, 1999.

External links
 Russian Ministry of Agriculture official website

Agriculture
Agriculture
Russia
Ministry of Agriculture (Russia)
Agricultural organizations based in Russia